Rami bronchiales or bronchial branches can refer to:
 Bronchial artery (rami bronchiales partis thoracicae aortae) (Arteriae bronchiales)
 Pulmonary branches of vagus nerve (rami bronchiales nervi vagi)